Arctohungarites is a genus of Triassic ammonoids now placed in the ceratitid family Danubitidae, but previously included in the Hungeritidae.

The shell of Arctohungerites is subdiscoidal, involute, with a  rounded venter, weak sigmoidal folds on the body chamber and a distinct ventral keel on the distal end of the chambered portion.  The suture is ceratitic.

Arctohungerites was found in Middle Triassic (Anisian) sediments in northern Siberia

References 

 Arkell et al. Mesozoic Ammonoidea; Treatise on Invertebrate Paleontology, Part L, Ammonoidea. Geol Soc of America and Univ Kansas press. R. C. Moore (Ed) 
 Classification of E. T. Tozer 1981

Ceratitida genera
Middle Triassic ammonites
Fossils of Russia
Anisian life